This topic covers notable events and articles related to 2016 in music.

Specific locations

Specific genres

Albums released

Significant performances 
 March 25 – British rock and roll band, The Rolling Stones become the first foreign rock band to perform in Cuba, which was documented in their 2016 concert film, The Rolling Stones: Havana Moon.

Awards 

{| class="wikitable"
|-
! 58th Annual Grammy Awards
|-
| 
|-
! Billboard Music Awards
|-
| {{small|Artist of the Year: Adele • New Artist of the Year: Fetty Wap • Top Hot 100 Song: See You Again • Top Billboard 200 Album: 25}}
|-
! 58th Japan Record Awards 
|-
| 
|-
! Mnet Asian Music Awards
|-
| 
|-
! MTV Video Music Awards
|-
| 
|-
! MTV Europe Music Awards
|-
| 
|-
! The 4th V Chart Awards 
|-
| 
|-
! Rock and Roll Hall of Fame
|-
| 
|}

Bands formed

 3B junior
 The Aces
 AOA Cream
 Astro
 Batten Girls
 BEJ48
 Bis
 Blackpink
 Bolbbalgan4
 BoybandPH
 Boys Generally Asian
 Chai
 Chelmico
 CocoSori
 Cosmic Girls
 Dreamcar
 DYGL
 The East Light
 Exo-CBX
 FEMM
 FlowBack
 Gang Parade
 GNZ48
 Gone Is Gone
 Gugudan
 The Hu
 Hiragana Keyakizaka46
 I.B.I
 I.O.I
 I Dont Know How But They Found Me
 Imfact
 Japanese Breakfast
 June's Diary
 Kard
 Keyakizaka46
 KNK
 Lovelytheband
 Magdalena Bay
 The Magpie Salute
 Mamalarky
 Måneskin
 MASC
 Midland
 MOBB
 Momoland
 Musubizm
 Nation of Language
 National Youth Orchestra of China
 NCT
 NCT 127
 Nice As Fuck
 Nine Muses A
 Ocean Park Standoff
 Off On Off
 OnePixcel
 Pentagon
 PrettyMuch
 Prophets of Rage
 Poppin'Party
 Pyxis
 Reol
 Rock A Japonica
 SeeYouSpaceCowboy
 ShuuKaRen
 SF9
 Sinsaenum
 Sports Team
 Tempalay
 Terror Jr
 The Sixth Lie
 The World Standard
 Unnies
 Victon
 VIMIC
 Voisper
 Vromance
 Why Don't We
 Yahyel
 Zenbu Kimi no Sei da.

Soloist debuts

 Agust D
 Alex the Astronaut
 Asaka
 Ayaka Sasaki
 Billie Eilish
 Bobby
 Celeste
 Danna Paola
 Danny Worsnop
 Dean
 Dermot Kennedy
 Derrick Monasterio
 Dodie
 Ella Mai
 Elo
 Enisa Nikaj
 Era Istrefi
 Eunji
 Fei
 Finneas
 Gemma
 Gun
 Hash Swan
 Hyoyeon
 Jang Dongwoo
 JC de Vera
 Jessica Jung
 Jessie Reyez
 Jenyer
 Jimin
 Jorja Smith
 Joy Crookes
 Jungah
 Jung Seung-hwan
 Justhis
 Jvcki Wai
 Kanna Hashimoto
 Kiana Ledé
 Kim Sejeong
 Kwak Jin-eon
 Kwon Jin-ah
 Lee Hyun-woo
 Liza Soberano
 Louis Tomlinson
 Luna
 Mino
 Mint
 Momoka Ariyasu
 Mone Kamishiraishi
 Nana Ou-yang
 Niall Horan
 Noah Cyrus
 Olivia O'Brien
 PH-1
 Punchnello
 Raye
 Ricky Montgomery
 Ryeowook
 Sam Kim
 Sandeul
 Shenseea
 Sofia Carson
 Suga
 Subin
 Tini Stoessel
 Taichi Mukai
 Tessa Violet
 Thunder
 Tiffany
 Tom Grennan
 Uru
 Yesung
 Yezi
 Ylona Garcia
 Yoochun
 Woohyun
 Zayn

Bands reformed

ABBA
At the Drive-In
Abandon All Ships
The Anniversary
Arab Strap
Bash & Pop
Belly
Blake Babies
A Different Breed of Killer
Eric B. & Rakim
Galactic Cowboys
Game Theory
G.R.L
Guided by Voices
Jet
Le Tigre
Letters to Cleo
Misfits (featuring Glenn Danzig)
Nasty Savage
The Number Twelve Looks Like You
Pendulum (Australian band)
Piebald
P.S. Eliot
Rainbow
Sechs Kies
A Thorn for Every Heart
The Revolution
The Righteous Brothers
Spice Girls – GEM
 Super Furry Animals
Temple of the Dog
A Thorn for Every Heart
Thursday
Tickle Me Pink
The Union Underground
The Vapors
Wolf Parade
The Zutons

Bands on hiatus
Camera Obscura
Chiodos
Coal Chamber
Man Overboard
Middle Class Rut
One Direction
We Are the In Crowd
Yeah Yeah Yeahs

Bands disbanded

2NE1
3rdeyegirl
4Minute
Agalloch
Allo Darlin'
Aiden
Bane
Blood on the Dance Floor
Bolt Thrower
Boom Boom Satellites
Crosby, Stills, Nash & Young
Dead or Alive
Dream
Eagles
Empire! Empire! (I Was a Lonely Estate)
The Enemy
Fearless Vampire Killers
Finch
For Today
Funeral for a Friend
FVK
Giant Sand
Girugamesh
G.L.O.S.S.
Gnashing of Teeth
Gossip
Graveyard
I, the Breather
Jack Ü
Joey + Rory
Sharon Jones & The Dap-Kings
La Ley
A Lighter Shade of Brown
Lionheart
Lush
Majical Cloudz
Marion
Matchbook Romance
Maybeshewill
Mischief Brew
Motion City Soundtrack
Mudvayne
Nektar
Nomeansno
P.M. Dawn
The Presidents of the United States of America
Rainbow
Sally Shapiro
Thee Satisfaction
School of Seven Bells
SMAP
Sockweb
Sorry About Dresden
Spirit of the West
The Stooges
Suicide
Transit
Twisted Sister
Viola Beach
Wodensthrone
You, Me, and Everyone We Know
Youth Lagoon

Deaths
January
 1
 Gilbert Kaplan, (74), American conductor and businessman, cancer.
 Mark B, (45), British hip-hop record producer.
 Gilberto Mendes, (93), Brazilian composer.
 2 – Rino Salviati, (93), Italian singer, guitarist and actor.
 3
 Paul Bley (83), Canadian jazz pianist.
 Jason Mackenroth (46), American rock drummer (Rollins Band, Mother Superior), prostate cancer.
 4
 Long John Hunter, (84), American blues guitarist and singer-songwriter.
 Achim Mentzel, (69), German musician and television presenter.
5
 Pierre Boulez, (90), French composer and conductor.
Nicholas Caldwell, (71), American R&B singer (The Whispers).
 Hanna-Marie Weydahl, (93), Norwegian pianist.
 7
 Kitty Kallen, (94), American singer ("Little Things Mean a Lot").
 Troy Shondell, (76), American singer, complications from Alzheimer's disease and Parkinson's disease.
 8
 Otis Clay, (73), American R&B and soul singer ("Tryin' to Live My Life Without You", "The Only Way Is Up"), heart attack.
Red Simpson, (81), American country singer-songwriter ("I'm a Truck"), complications from a heart attack.
Brett Smiley, (60), American singer-songwriter.
 10 – David Bowie, (69), English songwriter and artist.
 17 
 Carina Jaarnek (53), Swedish singer and Dansband artist (cerebral haemorrhage).
 Dale Griffin (67), British rock drummer (Mott the Hoople, Mott, British Lions).
 18 – Glenn Frey (67), American guitarist and vocalist (The Eagles).
 25 – Leif Solberg (101), Norwegian composer and organist.
 26
 T.J. Tindall (65), American guitarist (MFSB)
 Black (53), Pop/new wave singer-songwriter, Traffic accident
 28
 Signe Toly Anderson (74), American vocalist (Jefferson Airplane).
 Paul Kantner (74), American guitarist and vocalist (Jefferson Airplane).

February
 3 – Maurice White (74), founder of Earth, Wind and Fire.
 4
 Bobby Caldwell (68), American rock keyboardist (Terry Knight and the Pack)
 Ulf Söderblom (85), Finnish conductor.
 13
 Viola Beach, English indie rock band, car accident.
 Kristian "Kris" Leonard (20), Guitar and vocals.
 River Reeves (19), Guitar.
 Tomas Lowe (27), Bass.
 Jack Dakin (19), Drums.
 Craig Tarry (32), Band manager.
 19 – Harald Devold (51), Norwegian saxophonist (cancer).
 20 – Ove Verner Hansen (85), Danish actor and opera singer (cardiac arrest).
 22 – Sonny James (87), American country music singer-songwriter.
 24 – Lennie Baker (69), American rock and roll saxophonist and singer (Sha Na Na)
 29 – Josefin Nilsson (46), Swedish singer.

March
 3 – Gavin Christopher, 66, American R&B singer-songwriter and producer
 5 – Jimmy Henderson, 61, American guitarist (Black Oak Arkansas)
 8 – George Martin, (90), English producer.
 9
 Ray Griff (75), Canadian country singer-songwriter, (aspiration pneumonia).
 Naná Vasconcelos (71), Brazilian percussionist.
 10 
Keith Emerson (71), English pianist and keyboardist (Emerson, Lake & Palmer).
Ernestine Anderson (87), American jazz and blues singer
 12
Tommy Brown (84), American R&B singer
Jimmie Snell, 69, American soul and pop singer (Limmie & Family Cookin')
 13 – Sidney Mear, (97), American trumpeter.
 14 – Peter Maxwell Davies, (81), English composer and conductor
 22 – Phife Dawg, (45), American rap musician (A Tribe Called Quest), complications from diabetes.
 23 – James Jamerson, Jr., 58, American bass player (Chanson)
 24 – Peter Anders, 74, American singer-songwriter (The Trade Winds) and record producer
26 – David Baker, 84, American symphonic jazz composer

April
 2 – Gato Barbieri, (83), Argentine jazz saxophonist, pneumonia.
 3 – Bill Henderson, (90), American jazz vocalist and actor (Clue, City Slickers, White Men Can't Jump), cancer.
 6 – Merle Haggard, (79), American singer-songwriter ("Okie from Muskogee", "The Fightin' Side of Me", "Carolyn"), Grammy winner (1984, 1998, 1999), complications from pneumonia.
 13 – Mariano Mores, (98), Argentine tango composer and pianist.
 21
 Prince, (57), American musician.
 Lonnie Mack, (74), American rock, blues, and country singer-songwriter guitarist, natural causes.
 24
 Billy Paul, (81), American soul singer.
 Papa Wemba, (66), Congolese singer and musician.
 Jan Henrik Kayser, (81), Norwegian pianist.

May
 1 – Sydney Onayemi (78), Nigerian-born Swedish DJ.
 4 – Olle Ljungström (54), Swedish singer and guitarist.
 6 – Candye Kane, (54), American blues singer and entertainer
 9
 Jim Manolides (76), American rock and roll bassist (The Frantics)
 Riki Sorsa (63), Finnish singer.
 14 – Lasse Mårtenson (81), Finnish singer
 16 – Fredrik Norén (75), Swedish jazz drummer (death announced on this date)
 17 – Guy Clark, (74), American folk and country music singer-songwriter
 19 – John Berry, (52), American guitarist (Beastie Boys)
 21 – Nick Menza, (51), American instrumentalist, former drummer for the band Megadeth
 30 – Thomas Fekete, (27), American guitarist (Surfer Blood)

June
 2 – Freddie Wadling (64), Swedish singer and songwriter.
 3 – Dave Swarbrick, (75), British folk musician and singer-songwriter (Fairport Convention), emphysema.
 4 – Bobby Curtola, (73), Canadian singer.
 5 – Phyllis Curtin, (94), American soprano.
 6 – Rolf Schweizer, (80), German composer.
 8
 Vladislav Yankovsky, (64), Russian musician (Novosibirsk Youth Symphony Orchestra).
 Terje Fjærn (73), Norwegian orchestra conductor ("La det swinge").
 9 – J. Reilly Lewis, (71), American choral conductor and Baroque music specialist, heart attack.
 10
 Habib, (63), Iranian singer, heart attack.
 Christina Grimmie, (22), American singer-songwriter (Find Me) and talent show participant (The Voice''), gunshot wound.
 13 – Chips Moman, (79),  American producer, songwriter, guitarist.
 17 – Attrell Cordes, (46), American musician, producer and rapper, co-founder of P.M. Dawn.
 18 – Alejandro Jano Fuentes (45), Mexican singer and talent show participant (La Voz... México), gunshot wound.
 21 – Wayne Jackson (74), American soul and R&B musician (The Mar-Keys), congestive heart failure.
 22
 Amjad Sabri (39), Pakistani Qawwali singer, gunshot wound.
 Jim Boyd (60), Native American singer-songwriter and actor
 24 – Bernie Worrell, (72), American keyboardist and composer (Parliament-Funkadelic).
 27 – Pelle Gudmundsen-Holmgreen (83), Danish composer.
 28 – Scotty Moore (84), American guitarist (Elvis Presley).
 29 – Rob Wasserman (64), American composer and bass player (RatDog, Lou Reed).

July
 16
 Alan Vega (78), American vocalist and visual artist (Suicide).
 Bonnie Brown (77) American country music singer, member of The Browns.
 18 – Karina Jensen, Danish singer (Cartoons) (cancer).
 19 – Tamás Somló (73), Hungarian musician, singer, artist and composer (Locomotiv GT), cancer.
 26
 Sandy Pearlman (72), American producer (Blue Öyster Cult, The Clash), songwriter, educator, complications from cerebral hemorrhage.
 Roye Albrighton (67), German musician (Nektar), unspecified illness.
 27
 Pat Upton (75), American singer-songwriter and guitarist (Spiral Starecase).
 Einojuhani Rautavaara (87), Finnish composer.
 31 – Mike Mohede (32), Indonesian singer and talent show participant (Indonesian Idol), heart attack.

August
 3 – Ricci Martin (62), American musician.
 4
 Patrice Munsel (91), American coloratura soprano.
 Snaffu Rigor (69), Filipino singer and songwriter, lung cancer.
 5
 Richard Fagan (69), American songwriter and musician, liver cancer.
Vander Lee (50), Brazilian singer-songwriter.
6 – Guillermo Anderson (54), Honduran singer, thyroid cancer.
7
 B. E. Taylor (65), American musician ("Vitamin L"), brain cancer.
 Dolores Vargas (80), Spanish singer, complications of leukemia.
 Ruby Winters (74), American soul singer ("Make Love to Me", "I Will").
9
Pádraig Duggan (67), Irish musician (Clannad, The Duggans).
Jimmy Levine (61/62), American R&B musician and record producer.
11 – Glenn Yarbrough (86), American folk singer ("Baby the Rain Must Fall", "It's Gonna Be Fine", "San Francisco Bay Blues").
 12 – Ruby Wilson (68), American blues, soul and gospel singer, heart attack.
 13 – Connie Crothers (75), American jazz pianist, cancer.
 14 – James Woolley (49), American keyboard and synthesizer player (Nine Inch Nails, 2wo).
 15 – Bobby Hutcherson (75), Jazz vibraphonist, emphysema.
 19 – Horacio Salgán (100), Argentine tango musician.
 20
 Matt Roberts (38), American rock guitarist (3 Doors Down), drug overdose.
 Tom Searle (28), British rock guitarist (Architects), cancer.
 22
 Toots Thielemans (94), Belgian jazz musician.
 Gilli Smyth (83), English musician (Gong).
 28 – Juan Gabriel (66), Mexican singer and songwriter, heart attack.

September
 1
 Fred Hellerman, (89), American folk singer (The Weavers), guitarist, producer and songwriter.
 Kacey Jones, (66), American singer-songwriter ("I'm the One Mama Warned You About"), producer and humorist, cancer.
 2
 Jerry Heller, (75), American music manager (N.W.A.).
Gary D., (52), German trance producer and DJ, pulmonary embolism.
 3
 Fred McFarlane, (55), American songwriter ("Show Me Love", "Don't Wanna Go Home"), record producer and musician.
 Johnny Rebel, (77), American country singer. 
 7
 Clifford Curry, (79), American beach music and R&B singer ("She Shot a Hole in My Soul").
 Farhang Sharif, (85), Iranian musician and tar player.
 Graham Wiggins, (53), American musician.
 8 – Prince Buster, (78), Jamaican ska musician ("One Step Beyond", "Al Capone").
 10 – Chris Stone, (81), American recording studio owner (Record Plant) and entrepreneur, heart attack and stroke.
 12 – Hidayat Inayat Khan, (99), English-French composer and conductor.
 16
 Jerry Corbetta, (68), American musician (Sugarloaf), Pick's disease.
Trisco Pearson, (53), American R&B singer (Force MDs), cancer.
Qiao Renliang, (28), Chinese singer and actor, suicide.
 19 – Bobby Breen, (88), Canadian-born American actor and singer, natural causes.
 20 – Micki Marlo, (88), American singer and model.
 21
 Shawty Lo, (40), American hip-hop musician (D4L), traffic collision.
John D. Loudermilk, (82), American singer and songwriter ("Tobacco Road", "Then You Can Tell Me Goodbye", "Indian Reservation"), bone cancer.
 24 – Buckwheat Zydeco, (68), American accordionist and zydeco musician
 25
 Kashif, (59), American musician (B.T. Express) and record producer.
 Hagen Liebing, (55), German musician (Die Ärzte).
 Jean Shepard, (82), American honky tonk singer-songwriter ("A Dear John Letter", "Slippin' Away"), Parkinson's disease.
 26
 Joe Clay, (78), American rockabilly musician.
 Ioan Gyuri Pascu, (55), Romanian singer, producer, actor and comedian, heart attack.
 27
 , (46), Romanian folk singer, cancer.
, (80), Swedish singer.
 29
 Lecresia Campbell (53), American gospel singer, pulmonary embolism.
 Nora Dean (72), Jamaican singer.
 Royal Torrence (82), American soul music singer (Little Royal and The Swingmasters).
 30
 Oscar Brand (96), Canadian-born American folk singer-songwriter, author and radio broadcaster (WNYC).
 Michael Casswell (53), English guitarist.
 Lilleba Lund Kvandal (76), Norwegian opera singer.

October
 1 – Toni Williams (77), Cook Islands-born New Zealand singer.
 2
 Steve Byrd (61), English guitarist (Gillan, Kim Wilde), heart attack.
 Sir Neville Marriner (92), English conductor and violinist
 Thomas Round (100), British opera singer.
 3
 Ljupka Dimitrovska, (70), Macedonian-born Croatian singer.
K. David van Hoesen (90), American bassoonist.
Joan Marie Johnson (72), American singer (The Dixie Cups), heart failure.
 4 – Caroline Crawley (53), British singer and musician (Shelleyan Orphan, This Mortal Coil).
5 – Pompeiu Hărășteanu (81), Romanian opera singer.
7 – Anne Pashley (80), British athlete and opera singer, Olympic silver medalist (1956).
 8 – Don Ciccone (70), American singer-songwriter and musician (The Critters, The Four Seasons, Tommy James and the Shondells).
 9
 Bored Nothing (26), Australian musician, suicide.
 Michiyuki Kawashima (47), Japanese musician (Boom Boom Satellites), brain tumor.
 Quique Lucca (103), Puerto Rican musician, founder of La Sonora Ponceña.
 , (82), Canadian jazz drummer.
  (71), Romanian jazz musician, cancer.
 10 – Issa Bagayogo,= (54), Malian musician.
 11 – Peter Reynolds, (58), Welsh composer.
 12
 Robert Bateman, (80), American songwriter and record producer ("Please Mr. Postman"), heart attack.
 Sonny Sanders (77), American songwriter, arranger and record producer.
 15
 Danny Champagne (65), Jamaican music producer, complications from stroke.
Robert Edwards (74), American singer (The Intruders), heart attack.
20
 Achieng Abura, Kenyan musician.
 Brian Edwards (72), Canadian rock bassist and singer (Mashmakhan)
 Mieke Telkamp (82), Dutch singer.
23 – Pete Burns, (57), British singer (Dead or Alive)
24 – Bobby Vee (73) American pop singer who was a teen idol in the early 1960s
30 – Curly Putman, (85), American singer-songwriter. D-I-V-O-R-C-E, Green, Green Grass of Home and the subject of Paul McCartney & Wings song Junior's Farm.

November
1
Nico Carstens (90), South African accordionist and songwriter
Pocho La Pantera (65), Argentine cumbia singer
3 – Kay Starr (94), American pop and jazz singer, complications of Alzheimer's disease.
4
 Eddie Harsch, 59, Canadian keyboardist (The Black Crowes)
 Jean-Jacques Perrey, 87, French electronic music producer
7 – Leonard Cohen (82), Canadian singer-songwriter
11
 Victor Bailey (56), American jazz bass guitarist
 Esma Redžepova-Teodosievska, (73), Macedonian vocalist, songwriter, and humanitarian of Romani ethnicity.
 12 – Jacques Werup (71), Swedish musician and writer.
13 – Leon Russell (74), American musician and songwriter
15
 Holly Dunn (59), American country singer-songwriter
 Mose Allison (89), American pianist and singer.
18 – Sharon Jones (60), American soul and funk singer
24 – Pauline Oliveros (84), American composer
29 – Allan Zavod (71), Australian keyboardist and composer
30 – Ivar Thomassen (62), Norwegian folk singer, songwriter, and jazz pianist.

December
2
 Cash Askew (22), guitarist (Them Are Us Too)
 Mark Gray (64), American singer-songwriter (Exile)
4 – Ralph Johnson (67), American singer (The Impressions)
7 – Brian Bennett (65), American garage-rock keyboardist (The Cherry Slush)
8
 Greg Lake (69), English progressive-rock vocalist and multi-instrumentalist
 Junaid Jamshed (52), Pakistani singer-songwriter (Vital Signs), flight collision
11 – Joe Ligon (80), American gospel singer (Mighty Clouds of Joy)
24 – Rick Parfitt (68), English musician and songwriter (Status Quo)
25 – George Michael (53), English singer-songwriter (Wham!)

See also 

 Timeline of musical events
 Women in music

References

 
2016-related lists
Music by year